{{DISPLAYTITLE:C10H10N2}}
The molecular formula C10H10N2 (molar mass: 158.20 g/mol, exact mass: 158.0844 u) may refer to:

 1,5-Diaminonaphthalene
 1,8-Diaminonaphthalene
 Nicotyrine